The BioSteel All-American Game (formerly the CCM/USA Hockey All-American Prospects Game) is an annual ice hockey event in which 40 of the top American-born NHL Entry Draft eligible prospects play against each other in an exhibition game, each hoping to boost their draft ranking with the National Hockey League scouts and general managers who attend. To date, 74 alumni have been drafted in the NHL, including 15 first-round selections.

Results

NHL first round draft picks

See also
CHL/NHL Top Prospects Game

References

Ice hockey tournaments in the United States
National Hockey League Entry Draft
National Hockey League
2012 establishments in the United States
Recurring sporting events established in 2012